Prunum abyssorum is a species of sea snail, a marine gastropod mollusk in the family Marginellidae, the margin snails.

Description

Distribution
P. abyssorum can be found in the Gulf of Mexico, off the coast of Yucatan.

References

 Tomlin J.R. le B. (1916). Notes on Marginella. Journal of Conchology. 15: 43.
 Cossignani T. (2006). Marginellidae & Cystiscidae of the World. L'Informatore Piceno. 408pp.

External links
 Dall W. H. 1881. Reports on the results of dredging, under the supervision of Alexander Agassiz, in the Gulf of Mexico and in the Caribbean Sea (1877–78), by the United States Coast Survey Steamer "Blake", Lieutenant-Commander C.D. Sigsbee, U.S.N., and Commander J.R. Bartlett, U.S.N., commanding. XV. Preliminary report on the Mollusca. Bulletin of the Museum of Comparative Zoölogy at Harvard College, 9(2): 33–144
 Rosenberg, G.; Moretzsohn, F.; García, E. F. (2009). Gastropoda (Mollusca) of the Gulf of Mexico, Pp. 579–699 in: Felder, D.L. and D.K. Camp (eds.), Gulf of Mexico–Origins, Waters, and Biota. Texas A&M Press, College Station, Texas

Marginellidae
Gastropods described in 1916